Arteritic anterior ischemic optic neuropathy (AAION or arteritic AION) is the cause of vision loss that occurs in temporal arteritis (aka giant-cell arteritis). Temporal arteritis is an inflammatory disease of medium-sized blood vessels that happens especially with advancing age. AAION occurs in about 15-20 percent of patients with temporal arteritis. Damage to the blood vessels supplying the optic nerves leads to insufficient blood supply (ischemia) to the nerve and subsequent optic nerve fiber death. Most cases of AAION result in nearly complete vision loss first to one eye. If the temporal arteritis is left untreated, the fellow eye will likely suffer vision loss as well within 1–2 weeks. Arteritic AION falls under the general category of anterior ischemic optic neuropathy, which also includes non-arteritic AION. AION is considered an eye emergency, immediate treatment is essential to rescue remaining vision.

An exhaustive review article published in March 2009 described the latest information on arteritic and non-arteritic ischemic optic neuropathy, both anterior (A-AION and NA-AION) and posterior (A-PION, NA-PION, and surgical).

Symptoms 
There are several constitutional symptoms of temporal arteritis that may aid in diagnosis of AAION such as jaw claudication (spasms of the jaw muscle), scalp tenderness, unintentional weight loss, fatigue, myalgias and loss of appetite. However, many cases are asymptomatic.  There are also elevations in three blood tests that help identify AAION: erythrocyte sedimentation rate (ESR), C  reactive protein (CRP) and platelet count (thrombocytosis). A relate rheumatic disease  called polymyalgia rheumatica has a 15 percent incidence of giant cell arteritis.

Cause

Diagnosis
Prompt diagnosis is critical, since the sudden blindness in the one eye is often followed, within days, by similar sudden blindness in the second eye.  Treatment may prevent further damage (see below). Any patient diagnosed with non-arteritic AION over the age of 50 must be asked about the constitutional symptoms mentioned above.  Furthermore, AION patients over the age of 75 should often be blood tested regardless.

Treatment
AAION requires urgent and critical intervention with a very long course of corticosteroids to prevent further damage. While this treatment is in itself problematic, non-treatment leads to bilateral blindness and strokes.

There is much research currently underway looking at ways to protect the nerve (neuroprotection) or even regenerate new fibers within the optic nerve.

References

Eye diseases